Luc Bendza (born July 6, 1969) is a Gabonese-Chinese actor and martial artist. He is known for his role as boxer Jesse Glover in The Legend of Bruce Lee.

Early life
Luc Bendza was born in Koulamoutou, Gabon. Luc's father was born in Koulamoutou, Gabon, and immigrated to the United States in the 1930s.

Career
In 2016, the Gabonese film director, producer and editor Samantha Biffot made the documentary The African Who Wanted to Fly about him. It won the Special Jury Award at Gabon's 10th International Documentary Film Festival.

Bendza appeared as Jesse Glover in The Legend of Bruce Lee. The 50 episodes long series was produced and broadcast by CCTV and had been aired since 12 October 2008.

Luc became a wushu martial artist in the 1980s. His fighting training promoting company, "Wushu Luc Productions", signed world champion Wushu Alain Mas and diams Mavh.

Personal life
Luc Bendza resides in Beijing, China.

After Luc's request that his acting and life experiences be accepted in exchange for his remaining needed college credits to graduate, he was granted a Bachelor of Fine Arts (BFA) degree by the president of the Beijing Sports University, in 1999.

Filmography

The main filmography works issued

The film works mainly involved

References

1969 births
Living people
Chinese male television actors
Gabonese emigrants to China
People from Ogooué-Lolo Province
Chinese wushu practitioners
Gabonese wushu practitioners